Wiluna Airport  is an airport located  south of Wiluna, Western Australia, with two runways (one sealed and one unsealed) and landing lights. It has a small terminal building.

It was in operation in the 1930s.

Airlines and destinations

See also
 List of airports in Western Australia
 Aviation transport in Australia

References

External links
 Airservices Aerodromes & Procedure Charts

Airports in Western Australia
Wiluna, Western Australia